Dickinson is the name of some places in the U.S. state of New York:
Dickinson, Broome County, New York
Dickinson, Franklin County, New York